This is a list of members of the 53rd Legislative Assembly of Queensland from 2009 to 2012, as elected at the 2009 election held on 21 March 2009.

 On 4 May 2010, Beaudesert MP Aidan McLindon and Burnett MP Rob Messenger resigned from the Liberal Nationals to sit as independents. McLindon formed The Queensland Party in June; it was registered on 5 August. Messenger did not join the new party. The Queensland Party later merged with Katter's Australian Party in 2011.
 Dalrymple MP Shane Knuth resigned from the Liberal National Party and joined Katter's Australian Party on 30 October 2011.

See also
Speaker of the Legislative Assembly of Queensland
Premier: Anna Bligh (Labor) (2007–present)

References

Members of Queensland parliaments by term
21st-century Australian politicians